Ochuko Raphael Emuakpeje (born September 16, 1983) is a Nigerian Chess Player. He is a two-time former Nigeria National Chess Champion: He won the Nigeria National Chess Championship in 
2010 and 2015. Ochuko hails from Delta State, Nigeria. Ochuko taught himself to play chess in 1999. He has participated in many chess tournaments within Nigeria. He became a Certified FIDE Instructor (FI) in 2012. In December 2014, he got his first FIDE rating (2114) and represented Nigeria at the World Chess Olympiad Baku 2016. He was former Chess Coach at Delta State Chess Association. Ochuko is a Ph.D candidate of Public Administration at Nnamdi Azikiwe University, Awka, Nigeria.

References

External links
 KIGIGHA, ADU, OFOWINO, OTHERS QUALIFY TO REPRESENT NIGERIA AT WORLD CHESS OLYMPIAD
 Emuakpeje unseats Kigigha, wins N1m
 Our best player is now 2239, and there’s more chess this Thursday!
 Ochuko Emuakpeje stats
 Player stats

Nigerian chess players
1983 births
Living people